It is generally recognised that the first radio transmission was made from a temporary station set up by Guglielmo Marconi in 1895. This followed on from pioneering work in the field by a number of people including Alessandro Volta, André-Marie Ampère, Georg Ohm and James Clerk Maxwell.

The several potential contenders for the title of "oldest radio station" are listed below, organized by sign-on date.
These are not restricted to radio broadcasting, i.e., the transmissions were not necessarily intended to reach a wide audience.

Stations

AM on Mediumwave and Longwave

FM or Shortwave

Networks

See also
History of radio
Timeline of radio
History of broadcasting
AM broadcasting
Extended AM broadcast band
FM broadcasting
FM broadcasting in the USA
List of the initial commercial FM station assignments issued by the Federal Communications Commission on October 31, 1940
 
Oldest television station
Time signal

References

History of radio
Oldest
Radio
Radio stations
Radio stations